Hyden Humps Dam is situated at the southern base of The Humps, approximately  north east of Hyden and  north of Wave Rock.

Water

The dam is filled with rainwater runoff which is channeled off the Humps mountain.

Characteristics
The water source is now only used as a backup supply after the completion of the Great Southern scheme where water is piped through the wheatbelt region from the Harris River Dam.

See also
List of reservoirs and dams in Australia

References

Bibliography
 Serventy, Vincent. Article on The Humps, a rock formation near Hyden  W.A. Naturalist Vol. 3, No. 6, 1952. also at Research Note 552 - Battye Library.

External links
 Dam storage level

History of Western Australia
Dams in Western Australia
Reservoirs in Western Australia